Vambo Kaal (born 12 March 1949 Pöide Parish, Saare County) is an Estonian politician. He was a member of VII, VIII and IX Riigikogu. From 2003 to 2009, he was the mayor of Kiili.

References

Living people
1949 births
Members of the Riigikogu, 1992–1995
Members of the Riigikogu, 1995–1999
Members of the Riigikogu, 1999–2003
Estonian University of Life Sciences alumni
Mayors of places in Estonia
People from Hiiumaa Parish